Jakub Valský (born September 7, 1988) is a Czech professional ice hockey player. He played with Bílí Tygři Liberec in the Czech Extraliga .

References

External links

1988 births
Czech ice hockey forwards
Rytíři Kladno players
Living people
HC Bílí Tygři Liberec players
People from Slaný
Sportspeople from the Central Bohemian Region
HC Berounští Medvědi players
HC Benátky nad Jizerou players
BK Mladá Boleslav players
HC Kometa Brno players
Motor České Budějovice players
HC Slovan Bratislava players
Czech expatriate ice hockey players in Slovakia